Andrew or Andy Irvine may refer to:

Andrew Irvine (mountaineer) (1902–1924), English mountaineer
Andy Irvine (musician) (born 1942), Irish folk musician
Andy Irvine (rugby union) (born 1951), Scotland player and administrator
Andrew David Irvine (born 1958), Canadian philosopher and educator
Andrew Irvine (bassist) (born 1969), American bassist